The athletics competition at the 1955 Pan American Games was held in Mexico City, Mexico.

Medal summary

Men's events

Women's events

A = affected by altitude

Medal table

Participating nations

References

  .
 GBR Athletics: Pan American Games